John Hetherton (born 1992) is an Irish hurler who plays for Dublin Senior Championship club St. Vincent's and at inter-county level with the Dublin senior hurling team. He usually lines out as a forward.

Career

A member of the St. Vincent's club in Marino, Hetherton first came to prominence on the inter-county scene with the Dublin minor team in 2010. He subsequently lined out at under-21 level, while his performances with the Garda College in the Fitzgibbon Cup earned inclusion on the 2017 Team of the Year. Hetherton joined the Dublin senior hurling team in 2015.

Honours

Dublin
Walsh Cup: 2016

References

External links
John Hetherton profile at the Dublin GAA website

1992 births
Living people
Garda Síochána officers
Dublin inter-county hurlers
St Vincents (Dublin) hurlers